This is a list of venues used for professional baseball in San Diego, California. The information is a compilation of the information contained in the references listed.

Athletic Park
Home of: San Diego Bears - Southern California League (1913 only)
Location: "Newton Avenue southeast corner Sicard Street" [per city directory]
Currently: commercial businesses 

U.S. Navy athletic field
Home of: San Diego Aces - California State League (1929 only)
Location: same as Lane Field

Lane Field (baseball)
Home of: San Diego Padres - Pacific Coast League (1936-1957)
Location: West Broadway (south, first base); Harbor Drive (west, third base); Pacific Highway (east, right field); buildings and Ash Street (north, left field) 
Previously: U.S. Navy athletic field
Currently: Cruise Ship Parking

Westgate Park
Home of: San Diego Padres - PCL (1958-1967) 
Location: Friars Road at Route 163 
Currently: Fashion Valley Mall

Qualcomm Stadium a.k.a. San Diego Stadium and Jack Murphy Stadium, then SDCCU Stadium
Home of:
San Diego Padres - PCL (1968 only)
San Diego Padres - National League (1969-2003)
Location: 9449 Friars Road
Currently: parking lot for Snapdragon Stadium

Petco Park
Home of: San Diego Padres - NL (2004-present)
Also used as a neutral site in the 2020 MLB postseason
Location: 100 Park Boulevard - between 7th and 10th Avenues; J Street (north); San Diego Trolley (south)

See also
Lists of baseball parks

References
Peter Filichia, Professional Baseball Franchises, Facts on File, 1993.

External links
Union-Tribune article about San Diego ballparks

 
 
San Diego, California
Baseball
 
Baseball